The 13th Solitude Grand Prix was a non-Championship motor race, run to Formula One rules, held on 28 July 1963 at the Solitudering, near Stuttgart. The race was run over 25 laps of the circuit, and was won by Jack Brabham in a Brabham BT3.

Results

References

 "The Formula One Record Book", John Thompson, 1974.

Solitude Grand Prix
Solituderennen
Solitude Grand Prix